King Abdulaziz University College of Health Sciences is a college of King Abdulaziz University, Saudi Arabia. It comprises departments for pharmacy, surgery, laboratory medicine, and emergency medical services.

See also

 List of things named after Saudi Kings

Official website
College of Health Sciences, King Abdul Aziz University

Universities and colleges in Saudi Arabia